.lu is the Internet country code top-level domain (ccTLD) for Luxembourg. .lu domains are administered by RESTENA. Since 1 February 2010, the administrative contact no longer needs to be based in Luxembourg.

History

For many years, the application for .lu domains were done only via postal mail or fax. The fees for a .lu second level domain are €40 for the creation (or modification of a contact) and €40 yearly (including VAT). On 18 September 2006, the registry introduced a domain name registrar model. While the classic paper registration is possible, registering with a certified registrar is preferred by RESTENA.

References

External links 
 IANA .lu whois information
 .lu domain registration website

Country code top-level domains
Communications in Luxembourg
Council of European National Top Level Domain Registries members
Computer-related introductions in 1995

sv:Toppdomän#L